Mohammad-Reza Bahonar (born 2 February 1952) is an Iranian principlist politician who was member of the Parliament of Iran for 28 years. He is also secretary general of Islamic Society of Engineers and the Front of Followers of the Line of the Imam and the Leader. He is currently member of the Expediency Discernment Council.

Early years
Bahonar was born on 2 February 1952 in Kerman. He is the brother of former Prime Minister Mohammad-Javad Bahonar who was assassinated in 1981.

Career
Bahonar cofounded the Islamic Society of Engineers in 1991. He has been elected as a representative from Kerman and Tehran for six terms. He also served at the Expediency Council for three terms. He is considered a key member of the conservative alliance, and was considered a possible candidate for the post of the speaker or the leader of the conservative faction in the parliament. He later refused to run for the post of speaker possibly because of a deal made inside the conservative alliance, so he decided to run for the post of deputy speaker. He became the first deputy speaker on 6 June 2004 with 188 votes out of 259. The other running candidate for the post of deputy speaker was Mohammad-Hassan Aboutorabi Fard, a representative from Qazvin who became the second deputy speaker with 173 votes.

Following Hassan Rouhani's election as President, Bahonar was appointed by Chairman Ali Larijani as the parliament's liaison to the newly elected executive branch in transition mandate. On 25 December 2015, he announced he will retiring from his seat in Iranian Parliament after declined to run in 2016 election.

Attacking Iranian University students

In a speech at Shiraz University, Bahonar harshly attacked students of Amirkabir University who criticized Mahmoud Ahmadinejad in December 2006. His lecture generated anger among the students. He also called for punishing the students, while accusing them of being sex and alcohol addicts.

Electoral history

References

1952 births
Living people
First Deputies of Islamic Consultative Assembly
Second Deputies of Islamic Consultative Assembly
Islamic Society of Engineers politicians
Members of the Expediency Discernment Council
Members of the 9th Islamic Consultative Assembly
Members of the 8th Islamic Consultative Assembly
Members of the 7th Islamic Consultative Assembly
Followers of Wilayat fraction members
Central Council of the Islamic Republican Party members
Secretaries-General of political parties in Iran
People from Kerman Province
Iranian campaign managers